The western tinkerbird (Pogoniulus coryphaea) is an African barbet native to Central Africa, where it has been recorded at altitudes from .

It occurs in Cameroon, Democratic Republic of the Congo, Nigeria, Rwanda, and Uganda.

Taxonomy
African barbets are part of the Lybiidae family.

References

western tinkerbird
Birds of Sub-Saharan Africa
Birds of Central Africa
western tinkerbird
Taxonomy articles created by Polbot